A children's hospital is a hospital that offers its services exclusively to infants, children, adolescents, and young adults from birth up to until age 18, and through age 21 and older in the United States. In certain special cases, they may also treat adults. The number of children's hospitals proliferated in the 20th century, as pediatric medical and surgical specialties separated from internal medicine and adult surgical specialties.

Integration
Children's hospitals are characterized by greater attention to the psychosocial support of children and their families. Some children and young people have to spend relatively long periods in hospital, so having access to play and teaching staff can also be an important part of their care.  With local partnerships, this can include trips to local botanical gardens, zoos, and public libraries for instance.  Designs for the new Cambridge Children's Hospital, approved in 2022, plan to fully integrate mental and physical health provision for children and young people, bringing together services of  three partners: Cambridge University Hospitals NHS Foundation Trust, Cambridgeshire and Peterborough NHS Foundation Trust, and the University of Cambridge with physical and mental health services located alongside research activity.

Staffing

In addition to psychosocial support, children's hospitals have the added benefit of being staffed by professionals who are trained in treating children. A medical doctor that undertakes vocational training in paediatrics must also be accepted for membership by a professional college before they can practice paediatrics. These include the Royal Australasian College of Physicians (RACP), Royal College of Paediatrics and Child Health (RCPCH), and the American Board of Pediatrics. In New Zealand, the RACP offers vocational training in paediatrics. Once RACP training is completed the doctor is awarded the Fellowship of the RACP (FRACP) in paediatrics. While many normal hospitals can treat children adequately, pediatric specialists may be a better choice when it comes to treating rare afflictions that may prove fatal or severely detrimental to young children, in some cases before birth. Also, many children's hospitals will continue to see children with rare illnesses into adulthood, allowing for a continuity of care.

History

Early Voluntary Care 
Prior to the 19th century hospital reforms, the well-being of the child was thought to be in the hands of the mother; therefore, there was little discussion of children's medicine, and as a result next to no widespread formal institutions which focused on healing children. There were however centres which focused on helping abandoned children and offering care in hopes that these children might survive into adulthood. Some examples include orphanages, dispensaries, and foundling hospitals. Florence's Hospital of the Innocent (Ospedale degli Innocenti) was originally a charity based orphanage which opened in 1445; its aim was to nurse sick and abandoned infants back to health. A later example and better established institution whose goal it was to help rehabilitate infants was the Foundling Hospital founded by Thomas Coram in 1741. Foundling hospitals were set up to receive abandoned infants, nurse them back to health, teach them a trade or skill, and integrate them back into society. Coram's foundling hospital was revolutionary because it was one of the United Kingdoms first children charities. Moreover, it was largely made successful by the powerful people who donated money to the hospital. Coram's hospital would eventually be faced with the fact that the number of infants needing care outweighed their hospitals capacity. In order to accommodate the number of children in need, there were attempts to set up similar hospitals throughout the UK; they ultimately were unsuccessful due to the lack of funding. Simultaneously, dispensaries which were also funded by donations were being opened in order to provide medicine and medical attention to those who could not afford private care. Dispensaries and foundling hospitals were the earliest forms of what would later become children's hospitals. The establishing of the Foundling Hospital by Thomas Coram was a direct response to the high infant mortality rate in London, England. Although foundling hospitals acknowledged the high infant mortality rate, infant mortality would not be addressed in a wide spread way until the early 19th century when children's hospitals would begin to open in Vienna, Moscow, Prague, Berlin, and various other major cities throughout Europe.

19th-century models 
In America, by the mid-19th century middle-class women and physicians became increasingly concerned about the well-being of children in poor living conditions. Although infant mortality had begun to decline, it still remained a prominent issue. Social reformers blamed the emergence of the industrial society and poor parents for not properly caring for their children. In response, reformers and physicians founded children's hospitals across the country. Early children's hospitals were set up in converted houses not only to help the children transition from leaving their home to being in a hospital, but also because it was often the only space available. Early children's hospitals focused more on short-term care and treating mild illnesses rather than long-term intensive care. Treating serious diseases and illnesses in early children's hospitals could result in the disease spreading throughout the hospital which would drain their already limited resources. A serious disease outbreak in a children's hospital would result in more deaths than lives saved and would therefore reinforce the previous notion that people often died while in the hospital.

Like those found in the United States, children's hospitals in the United Kingdom in the 19th century often resembled middle-class homes. British children's hospitals introduced rules to which patients and their families were expected to adhere; these rules carefully lined out middle-class values and expectations. British children's hospitals, like their American and Canadian counterparts, relied heavily on donations from the rich. Donations came in the form of money, food, toys, and clothes for the children. The United Kingdom's children's hospitals were soon faced with the reality that their small and vulnerable patient would soon outnumber their resources. In order to maintain the cost of running these new hospitals throughout the United Kingdom, the upper classes needed to market their hospitals as centres for reform. In order to brand themselves as reformers, they had to contrast themselves against the parents; this meant they had to portray the poor parents as incompetent. Despite their mission to save children, hospitals in Britain and Glasgow rarely admitted children under the age of two; such children were deemed costly and needed constant attention. Similar to the American hospitals, those located in Europe were also hesitant to admit children who required long-term care in fear that those lives would be lost or that long-term care would block beds for those in immediate need. The intentions of the hospitals built in Europe were to provide care for those who could not afford care. Care was primarily provided to those who met the age requirements and were willing to adhere to the hospital's rules. Since early children's hospitals relied on donations, they were often underfunded, overcrowded, and lacking medical resources.

The first formally recognized paediatrics hospital was the Hôpital des Enfants Malades in Paris, France, which opened in 1802. The United Kingdom followed, establishing The Great Ormond Street Hospital in London, England, in 1852, which marked the opening of the first British children's hospital. The United States would soon follow and established The Children's Hospital of Philadelphia in Pennsylvania in 1855. Canada established their first children's hospital in 1875; The Hospital for Sick Children in Toronto, Ontario, along with the latter all remain open today. By the end of the 19th century, and the during the first two decades of the 20th century, the number of children's hospitals tripled in both Canada and the United States. The first children's hospital in Scotland opened in 1860 in Edinburgh.

Professionalization of Children's Hospitals 
In the 19th century, there was a societal shift in how children were viewed. This shift took away some of the parents' control and placed it in the hands of medical professionals. By the early 20th century, a child's health became increasingly tied to physicians and hospitals. Unlike the professionalization of nursing, the medical field professionalized at a greater speed. This was a result of licensing acts, the formation of medical associations, and new fields of medicine being introduced across countries. These new areas of medicine offered physicians the chance to build their careers by "overseeing the medical needs of private patients, caring for and trying new therapies on the sick poor, and teaching medical students." In order to raise their status further, physicians began organizing children's hospitals; by doing so, it also brought attention and importance to their speciality in the modern health care system. This idea brought about the creation of children's hospitals in Philadelphia, Boston, Washington, D.C, and San Francisco – all which emphasized children as their focus. Along with specialized physicians, the 20th century brought the removal of voluntary or religiously associated female care and replaced it with professionally trained nurses. In addition to separate institutions for children and a professional staff, both medical and technological advancement helped solidify children's hospitals as centres of physical healing. The discovery of vaccines, anaesthetics, and surgical improvements made children's hospitals more reliable and more effective in the treatment of childhood disease and illness.

Utilization in the United States
Using hospital discharge data from 2003 to 2011, the Agency for Healthcare Research and Quality (AHRQ)  studied trends in aggregate hospital costs, average hospital costs, and hospital utilization. The Agency found that for children aged 0–17, aggregate costs rose rapidly for the surgical hospitalizations and decreased for injury hospitalizations.  Further, average hospital costs, or cost per discharge, increased at least 2% for all hospitalizations and were expected to grow by at least 4% through 2013.  The exception to this was mental health hospitalizations, which saw a lower percentage increase of 1.2%, and was projected to increase only 0.9% through 2013. Despite the rising aggregate costs and costs per discharge, hospitalizations (except for mental health hospitalizations) for children aged 0–17 decreased over the same time, and were projected to continue decreasing.

In 2006–2011, the rate of emergency department (ED) use in the United States was highest for patients aged under one year, but lowest for patients aged 1–17 years.  The rate of ED use for patients aged under one year declined over the same time period; this was the only age group to see a decline.

Between 2008 and 2012, growth in mean hospital costs per stay in the United States was highest for patients aged 17 and younger. In 2012 there were nearly 5.9 million hospital stays for children in the United States, of which 3.9 million were neonatal stays and 104,700 were maternal stays for pregnant teens.

Ranking
Every year U.S. News & World Report ranks the top children's hospitals and pediatric specialties in the United States. For the year 2010–2011, eight hospitals ranked in all 10 pediatric specialties. The ranking system used by U.S. News & World Report depends on a variety of factors. In past years (2007 was the 18th year of Pediatric Ranking), ranking of hospitals has been done solely on the basis of reputation, gauged by random sampling and surveying of pediatricians and pediatric specialists throughout the country. The ranking system used is currently under review.

See also
 List of children's hospitals
 Pediatrics
 Child life specialist
List of children's hospitals in the United States

References

Pediatric organizations